Cheryl Koh (born ) is a Singaporean pastry chef who works at French restaurant Les Amis in Singapore. She was named Asia's Best Pastry Chef 2016 by The World's 50 Best Restaurants.

Career
Cheryl Koh attended St Nicholas Girls' School and Catholic Junior College, and then the National University of Singapore where she studied Geography and European Studies. Following graduation, she started working full time in the kitchen of Raffles Hotel, having worked there part time as a student. She worked there for a year, and decided to pursue a career in professional kitchens. She then moved to Paris, where she worked in the restaurant Lasserre.

After a further two years, she moved to Dubai and worked at the Burj Al Arab hotel. Then a stint at the Don Alfonso 1890 restaurant in Italy was followed by working at the Mandarin Oriental, Hong Kong and the restaurant Cepage. When that restaurant closed, she relocated to Les Amis in Singapore, another restaurant in the same group. Under the same group as the restaurant, she has also opened a dessert only restaurant called Tarte by Cheryl Koh. In 2016, Koh was named Asia's Best Pastry Chef by The World's 50 Best Restaurants.

References

1980s births
Living people
Pastry chefs
Women chefs
People from Singapore
Singaporean chefs
Catholic Junior College alumni
CHIJ Saint Nicholas Girls' School alumni
National University of Singapore alumni